Andelain is a commune in the Aisne department and Hauts-de-France region of northern France.

Geography
Andelain is located some 24 km south-southeast of Saint Quentin and 4 km east of Tergnier.  It can be accessed by the D13 road from Charmes in the northeast passing through the village and continuing to Deuillet in the southwest.  The D1032 road also runs through the north of the commune from west to east and the D553 road cuts through the southwestern corner of the commune. Apart from the village the commune consists entirely of farmland with no other villages or hamlets.

The Oise river forms a small part of the northwestern border of the commune and a stream flows through the northwestern part of the commune into the Oise river.

Neighbouring communes and villages

Administration

List of Successive Mayors of Andelain

Population

Culture and heritage

Civil heritage
The Park of the Maguin Chateau (19th century) is registered as an historical monument.

Religious heritage

The Church of Saint-Denis (12th century). is registered as an historical monument. The Church contains several items that are registered as historical objects:
A Fragment of a Retable (18th century)
A Statue: Saint Eveque seated (17th century)
A Statue: Saint Sebastian (17th century)
A Baptismal pool (15th century)
A Baptismal pool (15th century)
A Statue: Saint Barbe (16th century)
A Statue: Saint Antoine (16th century)
A Group Sculpture: Christ on the Cross with the Virgin and Saint John (15th century)
Stained glass windows (16th century)

See also
 Communes of the Aisne department

References

External links
 Andelain official website 
 Andelain on the old National Geographic Institute website 
 Bell Towers website 
 40000 Bell Towers website 
Andelain on Géoportail, National Geographic Institute (IGN) website 
Andelain on the 1750 Cassini Map

Communes of Aisne